John Henniker-Major, 2nd Baron Henniker (19 April 1752 – 4 December 1821) was a British peer and Member of Parliament (MP).

Henniker was the son of John Henniker, 1st Baron Henniker, and Anne Major. He was educated at Eton and St John's College, Cambridge. He was elected to the House of Commons for New Romney in 1785, a seat he held until 1790, and then represented Steyning from 1794 to 1802. In 1803 he succeeded his father as second Baron Henniker but as this was an Irish peerage it did not entitle him to a seat in the House of Lords. He instead returned to the House of Commons as the representative for Rutland in 1805, which he remained until 1812, and then sat for Stamford between 1812 and 1818. In 1792 he assumed by Royal licence the additional surname of Major. Lord Henniker died in December 1821, aged 69, and was succeeded in his titles by his nephew John.

Notes

References

Kidd, Charles, Williamson, David (editors). Debrett's Peerage and Baronetage (1990 edition). New York: St Martin's Press, 1990,

External links 
 

Henniker, John Henniker-Major, 2nd Baron
Henniker, John Henniker-Major, 2nd Baron
People educated at Eton College
Alumni of St John's College, Cambridge
British MPs 1784–1790
British MPs 1790–1796
British MPs 1796–1800
Members of the Parliament of Great Britain for English constituencies
Members of the Parliament of the United Kingdom for English constituencies
UK MPs 1801–1802
UK MPs 1802–1806
UK MPs 1806–1807
UK MPs 1807–1812
UK MPs 1812–1818
UK MPs who inherited peerages
Eldest sons of British hereditary barons
Fellows of the Royal Society
Barons Henniker